Robert II of Taranto (1319 or early winter 1326 – 10 September 1364), of the Angevin family, Prince of Taranto (1331–1346), King of Albania (1331–1364), Prince of Achaea (1332–1346), and titular Latin Emperor (1343 or 1346 – 1364).

He was the oldest surviving son of Prince Philip I of Taranto (1278–1331) and Empress Catherine II of Valois.

In 1332, as a result of an exchange with his uncle John of Gravina, Robert became Prince of Achaea. Because of his youth, authority was effectively exercised by his mother Catherine II of Valois until her death in 1346.  At that point Robert inherited the throne of the Latin Empire, and was recognized as emperor by the Latin states of Greece.  His actual power, such as it was, remained based upon his authority as prince of Achaea.  In Naples, on 9 September 1347 he married Marie of Bourbon, the daughter of Louis I, Duke of Bourbon Constable of Cyprus, but the marriage was childless.  When he died on 10 October 1364, his widow attempted to keep the principality for herself and her son from her previous marriage.  However, Robert's younger brother Philip II of Taranto succeeded as the legitimate heir. He died in Naples and was buried there.

Notes

Sources
 
 

|-

|-

14th-century births
1364 deaths

Year of birth uncertain
14th-century Latin Emperors of Constantinople
House of Anjou-Taranto
Princes of Achaea
Princes of Taranto
Albanian monarchs
County palatine of Cephalonia and Zakynthos